Sangre Chicana (Spanish for "Chicano Blood") is the ring name of retired Mexican professional wrestler Andrés Durán Reyes (born November 30, 1951). Reyes made his professional wrestling debut in 1973, wearing a red mask with a gold stripe, under the name Lemus. A year later he changed his name to Sangre Chicana but kept the mask with the golden stripe. He rose to prominence in a feud with El Cobarde and Fishman that led to a Lucha de Apuesta, mask vs. mask match where Reyes lost his mask.

Reyes is one of the very few wrestlers to work for both Empresa Mexicana de Lucha Libre (EMLL) (now known as Consejo Mundial de Lucha Libre (CMLL)) and Francisco Flores' promotion Toreo Cuatro Caminos Independents. Over the years the Chicana "family" grew, as "Lemus I" debuted in the 1980s using Reyes original mask, followed by "Lemus II" in the 1990s. In 2000, Reyes' sons "Lemus Jr." and "Sangre Chicana Jr." made their professional wrestling debuts followed by Sangre Imperial, Hijo de Sangre Chicana, and daughters Lady Chicana, Lluvia and La Hiedra

Professional wrestling career
Andrés Reyes made his professional wrestling debut in July 1973 as the enmascarado (masked) character Lemus. Less than a year after his debut, he was forced to remove his mask as he lost a Lucha de Apuesta (bet match) to El Canek and had to remove the mask per Lucha Libre traditions. Not long after his mask loss, Reyes began working as the enmascarado character Sangre Chicana, Chicana wore the same mask as he did while wrestling as Lemus; this was possible because he began wrestling outside his home state and at the time information did not travel as fast.

After wrestling under a mask for some years, he finally gained some notoriety as he began a feud with Fishman and El Cobarde. This feud led to another Lucha de Apuesta, this time between all three men, a match that Fishman won, unmasking Sangre Chicana. The loss of the mask was the first step towards Sangre Chicana becoming a headline wrestler as he defeated José Luis Mendieta on November 19, 1977, to win the Mexican National Middleweight Championship, only two months after he was unmasked. He vacated the championship in 1979, but the reason for the vacation is unclear. He held the NWA World Middleweight Championship twice in 1980-1981 defeating Cachorro Mendoza and Tony Salazar to win the title and lost it to Ringo Mendoza on April 3, 1981. In 1982 he briefly held the NWA International Junior Heavyweight Championship for 19 days. In 1982, Chicana jumped to the Universal Wrestling Association (UWA) where he resumed his feud with Fishman, trading the UWA World Light Heavyweight Championship four times in total over a period of 16 months. When he returned to Empresa Mexicana de Lucha Libre he teamed up with Cien Caras, defeating Ringo and Cachorro Mendoza to win the Mexican National Tag Team Championship, a title they would hold until Rayo de Jalisco and Tony Benetto won it from them. Between 1989 and 1990 Sangre Chicana held the UWA promoted WWF Light Heavyweight Championship on two occasions.

When the UWA folded, Chicana worked full-time for Consejo Mundial de Lucha Libre (CMLL; Formerly EMLL) where he teamed with Bestia Salvaje and Emilio Charles, Jr. for a CMLL World Trios Championship reign. In the late 1990s, Sangre Chicana left CMLL and began working for AAA where he defeated Máscara Sagrada II to win the Mexican National Light Heavyweight Championship. His run with the title lasted 715 days, from May 16, 1998, until April 30, 2000 when he lost the belt to Latin Lover. On August 20, 2004, Chicana won the AAA Americas Heavyweight Championship, a title held until he left AAA. While he is still listed as the current championship the title has technically been inactive since Chicana left the promotion. In recent years, Sangre Chicana has worked only select dates on the Mexican independent circuit, often together with his son Sangre Chicana, Jr.

Championships and accomplishments
AAA
AAA Americas Heavyweight Championship (1 time)
Mexican National Light Heavyweight Championship (1 time)
Empresa Mexicana de Lucha Libre / Consejo Mundial de Lucha Libre
CMLL World Trios Championship (1 time) - with Bestia Salvaje and Emilio Charles, Jr.
Mexican National Middleweight Championship (1 time)
Mexican National Tag Team Championship (1 time) - with Cien Caras
NWA International Junior Heavyweight Championship (1 time)<ref name=NWAIntJr>"></</ref>
NWA World Middleweight Championship (2 times)
Salvador Lutteroth Trios Tournament – with Bestia Salvaje and Emilio Charles, Jr.
Universal Wrestling Association
UWA World Light Heavyweight Championship (2 times)
WWF Light Heavyweight Championship (2 times)

Luchas de Apuestas record

Footnotes

References

1951 births
Living people
Masked wrestlers
Mexican male professional wrestlers
Professional wrestlers from Coahuila
Mexican National Middleweight Champions
Mexican National Tag Team Champions
20th-century professional wrestlers
21st-century professional wrestlers
CMLL World Trios Champions
NWA World Middleweight Champions
NWA International Junior Heavyweight Champions
UWA World Light Heavyweight Champions
Mexican National Light Heavyweight Champions